Christine Howell may refer to:

 Christine Warden (born 1950), née Ηοwell, English 400 metres hurdler
 Christine Moore Howell (1899–1972), hair care product businesswoman